Sergey Izmaylov (born 1 May 1975) is a Ukrainian triple jumper.

He competed at the 1997 World Indoor Championships and the 2000 Olympic Games without reaching the final.

His personal best jump is 17.01 metres, achieved in August 2000 in Kyiv.

Achievements

References 

1975 births
Living people
Ukrainian male triple jumpers
Athletes (track and field) at the 2000 Summer Olympics
Olympic athletes of Ukraine
Competitors at the 1997 Summer Universiade
Competitors at the 1999 Summer Universiade